Atanka is a 1986 Bengali crime drama film directed by Tapan Sinha. The film stars Soumitra Chatterjee, Prosenjit Chatterjee, and Satabdi Roy in her debut film. The film was known for its dark-tone and outstanding performances of the cast. The film ran for around 90 consecutive days at Mitra cinemas, west Bengal. The film was both critically and commercially successful and won 7 awards, and got an official entry at the Indian Panorama Section.

Plot
The story revolves around a school master who witnesses a murder by his students, but the students threaten him not to speak a word, but he goes beyond the line and courageously punishes the students by the help of the law.

Cast
Soumitra Chatterjee
Prosenjit Chatterjee
Satabdi Roy
Nirmal Kumar
Manoj Mitra
Anil Chatterjee
Sumanta Mukherjee

References

External links

Films directed by Tapan Sinha